When the Camellia Blooms is a 2019 South Korean television series starring Gong Hyo-jin, Kang Ha-neul, Kim Ji-seok, Son Dam-bi, Kim Kang-hoon. It aired on KBS2's Wednesdays and Thursdays at 22:00 (KST) time slot from September 18 to November 21, 2019. Each episode was released on Netflix in South Korea and most Asia-Pacific and English speaking countries after their television broadcast.

When the Camellia Blooms became the highest rated mini-series drama airing in 2019 with a single episode rating of  23.8%. According to Nielsen Korea, the drama also became the second highest rated drama of 2019 with all episodes' average ratings of 14.83% behind SBS's The Fiery Priest.
The series was met with praise by critics and audiences for its production and solid actors' performances. It also received favourable reviews for its realistic plot and unique genre combinations of romantic-comedy and thriller.
The drama received 10 nominations at 56th Baeksang Arts Awards, winning 4 – Grand Prize for Television, Best Screenplay, Best Actor for Kang Ha-neul and Best Supporting Actor for Oh Jung-se and won multiple awards at 2019 KBS Drama Awards including Grand Prize for Gong Hyo-jin.

Synopsis
When the Camellia Blooms is the story of Oh Dong-baek (Gong Hyo-jin), a single mother who moves to the fictional town of Ongsan and opens a bar named Camellia. Dong-baek faces many challenges and meets a variety of colourful characters as she attempts to settle down in the small town. Six years later, Dong-baek meets playful Yong-sik (Kang Ha-neul), a justice seeking police officer who declares his love for her. Meanwhile, a notorious killer sets out to claim Dong-baek as his next victim. Yong-sik balances his attempts to woo Dong-baek who does her best as a single working mother, while also discovering the killer’s identity.

Cast

Main
 Gong Hyo-jin as Oh Dong-baek
A single mother who runs a bar called "Camellia" in Ongsan. She is the mother of Pil-gu and ex-girlfriend to Jong-ryul. Although initially she does not reciprocate Yong-sik's feelings, she eventually grows to like him the more he spends time with her and her son. 
 Kang Ha-neul as Hwang Yong-sik
A police officer with a strong instinct for finding and beating up criminals. He moves back to his hometown Ongsan after being demoted and there he meets and falls for Dong-baek. He vows to always be on her side and protect both her and her son, even at his mother's disapproval. He becomes focused on catching the serial killer known as "Joker" after Dong-baek becomes his next target.
 Kim Ji-seok as Kang Jong-ryul
A famous baseball player and ex-boyfriend to Dong-baek. He is shown to be continuously self-centered and jealous of Yong-sik's relationship with Dong-baek and Pil-gu.
 Ji Yi-soo as Jessica / Park Sang-mi
Wife to Jong-ryul she's insecure and mainly focuses on trying to be a social media icon. She is mostly neglectful of her daughter and takes advantage of her relationship with Jong-ryul for fame.
 Oh Jung-se as No Gyu-tae
Dong-baek's landlord, who repeatedly hits on her. He is unhappily married to Ja-young.
 Yeom Hye-ran as Hong Ja-young
A very intelligent lawyer and wife to Gyu-tae. She often talks down to her husband because of his incompetency.
 Son Dam-bi as Choi Hyang-mi / Choi Go-woon
A part time employee at Camellia and Dong-baek's friend. She is a kleptomaniac. She often talks about moving to Copenhagen and is always looking for ways to gain enough money, leading her to blackmail others.
 Kim Kang-hoon as Kang Pil-gu
Dong-baek's 8-year-old son, who plays baseball and is very protective of his mother.
 Go Doo-shim as Kwak Deok-soon
Yong-sik's widowed mother who runs a marinated crab restaurant in Ongsan. 
 Lee Jung-eun as Jo Jung-sook
Dong Baek's mother who abandoned her as a child. 
 Jeon Bae-soo as Byun Bae-soo
The chief police in Ongsan and Yong-sik's superior.

Supporting

Ongsan Crab Alley
 Kim Sun-young as Park Chan-sook
 Kim Dong-hyeon as Song Jin-bae
 Kim Mi-hwa as Kim Jae-yeong
 Lee Seon-hee as Jeong Gwi-ryeon
 Han Ye-joo as Jo Ae-jeong
 Lee Sang-yi as Yang Seung-yeop
 Kim Mo-ah as Yang Seung-hee
 Baek Hyun-joo as Oh Ji-hyeon 
 Lee Joong-yeol as Han Tae-hee
 Jin Yong-wook as Choi Jong-rok
 Lee Kyu-sung as Park Heung-sik
 Carson Allen as Helena

Ongsan Police
 Lee Jae-woo as Kwon Oh-joon
 Park Yeon-woo as Park Seong-min

Others
 Hwang Young-hee as Lee Hwa-ja
 Baek Eun-hye as Sung-hee
 Yoo Yeon as Lee Ji-ho
 Jeon Guk-hyang as Hong Eun-sil
 Kim Geon as Song Joon-gi
 Yoon Seong-woo as Soo-bong
 Seo Jang-hyeon as Dae-seong
 Kim Dae-gon as Shaman performing funeral	
 Jang Ye-rim as restaurant employee
 Jeong Eun-jeong as waitress
 Park Bo-eun as staff
 Kyeong Gi-hyeon as staff 
 Kim Han-na as Hye-in
 Kang Tae-woong as Number 7 
 Kwon Eun-seong as Hye-hoon
 Jeon Eun-mi as co-op member
 Hong Seo-joon as Jeong Chan-geol
 Kim Gi-cheon as Park Man-seop

Special appearances
 Choi Dae-chul as Hwang Kyu-sik, Yong-sik's eldest brother (Ep. 26)
 In Gyo-jin as Hwang Doo-sik, Yong-sik's second brother (Ep. 26)
 Jung Ga-ram as adult Pil-gu (Ep. 36, 40)

Original soundtrack

Part 1

Part 2

Part 3

Part 4

Part 5

Part 6

Part 7

Part 8

Part 9

Part 10

Part 11

Special OST

Pop OST

Chart performance

Viewership

Awards and nominations

Notes

References

External links
  
 
 
 
 

2019 South Korean television series debuts
2019 South Korean television series endings
Korean Broadcasting System television dramas
South Korean romantic comedy television series
South Korean thriller television series
Television series by Pan Entertainment
Korean-language Netflix exclusive international distribution programming